The International Institute of Refrigeration (IIR) (also known, in French, as the Institut International du Froid (IIF)), is an independent intergovernmental science and technology-based organization which promotes knowledge of refrigeration and associated technologies and applications on a global scale that improve quality of life in a cost-effective and environmentally sustainable manner, including:
 Food quality and safety from farm to consumer
 Comfort in homes and commercial buildings
 Health products and services
 Low temperature technology and liquefied gas technology
 Energy efficiency
 Use of non-ozone-depleting and low global warming refrigerants in a safe manner.

Its scientific and technical activities are coordinated by ten commissions which are divided into five distinct sections.

History 

The early 19th century witnessed a sharp increase in the demand for natural ice during the summer months, particularly among breweries producing lager. Thanks to the advent of railways and steam ships, natural ice came onto the market. In order to meet demand, suppliers began looking for alternative ways of producing ice artificially.

Thus, entrepreneurs begin research on the means of producing ice.

Although Oliver Evans was the first to document the cycle, it was Jacob Perkins, an American working in England, who first patented a machine based on the vapour-compression cycle in 1835.

In 1855, the first compression machines that proved to be successful on an industrial scale were developed by James Harrison. Ferdinand Carré invented the absorption device in 1859, then came the model of vapor compression refrigerator.

This absorption machine was later replaced by a much simpler vapour-compression refrigerator, invented by French engineer Charles Tellier in 1885, that is still used today.

In order to support the development of refrigeration technologies and in view of the economic development potential they represented, the IIR was created in several stages:

 October 5–10, 1908 - The rapidly growing, global industry and scientific quest for absolute zero lead to the 1st International Congress of Refrigeration held in Paris, France, at the Paris-Sorbonne University, which welcomed over 5,000 participants.
 January 25, 1909 - From this first Congress, the International Association of Refrigeration was born, formed by delegates from 35 countries. 
 June 21, 1920 - The association was reorganised and officially titled as the International Institute of Refrigeration – IIR (Institut International du Froid – IIF, in French).

The IIR status as an international organisation were defined by an International Agreement signed on December 1, 1954, and General Regulations for the Application of the International Agreements signed on November 20, 1956.

Since then, the IIR has been operating at its headquarters based in Paris and is now an international organisation for expertise on refrigeration. The institute has continued to run the International Congress of Refrigeration every four years since its inauguration and has now expanded its event portfolio to ten conference series covering a vast variety of refrigeration topics. Working alongside governments, today the IIR remains committed to promoting knowledge on refrigeration for sustainable development, and continues to provide key services to disseminate information on associated technologies to all stakeholders (companies, universities, professionals...).

Organization 
The IIR is a bilingual organization that works in both English and French and operates thanks to:
 the activities of its international network comprising over 400 Commission members
 its benefactor, corporate and private members
 the annual contributions from its 59 member countries.

Statutory bodies

General Conference 

The General Conference of the IIR defines the general policy of the IIR and convenes once every four years during its international congress. It includes representatives appointed by member countries.

Prof. Min Soo Kim (Seoul National University) is currently President of the General Conference; he was elected in August 2019. The General Conference elects the president and vice-presidents of the executive committee.

Executive committee 

The executive committee of the IIR handles the administrative and financial aspects of the daily running of the IIR, and meets once per year. It includes one delegate per member country, a president and three to six vice-presidents.

Since August 2019, the President of the executive committee is Prof. Felix Ziegler (Delegate of Germany and professor at the Institute for Energy Engineering, Technical University of Berlin).

Management Committee 

The Management Committee is responsible for the general management of the IIR in between Executive Committee meetings. It includes:
 the President of the Executive Committee
 three members elected every four years by the Executive Committee
 three members elected every four years by the Science and Technology Council

Science and Technology Council 
The Science and Technology Council (STC) coordinates the scientific and technical activities of the IIR. The Science and Technology Council includes five distinct Sections that are in turn divided into ten Commissions. The Science and Technology Council includes:
 one President
 six Vice-presidents
 ten Commission Presidents
 one congress liaison contact person.

The President of the STC, Mr Gérald Cavalier (Cemafroid), was elected in August 2019.

Commissions 
The scientific activities of the IIR are organised into five Sections, each of which is divided into two Commissions; there are thus 10 Commissions:

Section A: Cryogenics and Liquefied Gases 

Section A on Cryogenics and Liquefied Gases focuses on refrigeration science and technology at low temperatures: the cryogenic domain spans the lower part of the temperature scale, from absolute zero to 120 K, thus encompassing the normal boiling points of air gases as well as of liquid natural gas (LNG).

Section A comprises two Commissions, A1 Cryophysics and Cryoengineering, and A2 Liquefaction and Separation of Gases. Commission A1 deals with research, development and industrial activities at the lowest temperatures, including low-temperature physics, applications of superconductivity and helium cryogenics. Commission A2 essentially covers the liquefied gas industry, including air separation and LNG technology, two mature domains with high economic stakes and ongoing developments addressing important societal issues such as energy efficiency and carbon sequestration.

Section A also maintains and develops relations with other Sections of the IIR, mainly Commission B1 Thermodynamics and Transfer Processes in the field of thermodynamics and transfer processes, essential tools of the cryogenic engineer, and Commission C1 Cryobiology, Cryomedicine and Health Products for the cooling of biological specimens and living tissues for preservation or treatment which require implementing cryogenic processes. Section A consists of a panel of multidisciplinary professionals and experts in sciences and technologies such as thermodynamics, condensed matter physics, materials science, heat transfer, fluid dynamics, vacuum and leak-tightness, instrumentation and process control, applied to the low-temperature domain.

The President of Section A is Dr Ralf Herzog (Honorary Director of ILK Dresden - Institut für Luft- und Kältetechnik gGmbH).

 Commission A1: Cryophysics and Cryoengineering

Commission A1 on Cryophysics and Cryoengineering deals with research, development and industrial activities at the lowest temperatures, including low-temperature physics, applications of superconductivity and helium cryogenics.

The president of Commission A1 is Dr Ales Srnka (Institute of Scientific Instruments of the CAS).
 Commission A2: Liquefaction and Separation of Gases

The  work  of  Commission A2 Liquefaction and Separation of Gases reflects world-wide activities in the domain of separation of  gases  and  liquefaction.  Apart  from  the personal involvement of Commission members in  various  projects,  the commission is present  at conferences,  workshops  and  seminars:  LNG International  Exhibition  and  Conference, GASTECH,  Cryogenics,  Cryogen  Expos, European  Cryogenic  Course  and  others.

The commission is close to academia, industry and end users of separated and liquefied gases.
Commission members work closely with Commission A1 Cryophysics, Cryoengineering  and  Commission  C1  Cryobiology, Cryomedicine and Health Products.

The president of Commission A2 is Dr Peng Zhang (Shanghai Jiao Tong University).

Section B: Thermodynamics, Equipment and Systems 

Section B on Thermodynamics, Equipment and Systems of the IIR focuses on the technological and scientific fundamentals of classical refrigeration, excluding cryogenic temperatures. The fundamentals are represented by its Commission B1 Thermodynamics and Transfer Processes whereas Commission B2 Refrigerating Equipment covers all kinds of refrigeration technology. Section B is a key player in most of the IIR international conferences; except for the International Conference of Refrigeration (ICR) organised every four years for all 10 IIR Commissions, where approximately 50% of all presentations are related to Section B topics.

Independently, and together with other Sections, Section B hosts a multitude of conferences such as the Gustav Lorentzen Conference on Natural Working Fluids and the Ohrid Conference on Ammonia and  Refrigeration Technologies; or conferences on Thermodynamic Properties and Transfer Processes of Refrigerants, on Magnetic Refrigeration at Room Temperature, on Compressors and Coolants, and on Phase Change Materials and Slurries for Refrigeration and Air Conditioning.

A number of Working Groups, where emerging topics in refrigeration are discussed by IIR experts with the aim of publishing results in handbooks or other forms publications, are organised within the scope of Section B. Main topics include mitigation of direct emissions of greenhouse gases in refrigeration, refrigerant charge reduction in refrigerating systems, magnetic cooling, life cycle climate performance evaluation, and refrigerant system safety.

The president of Section B is Prof. Eckhard Groll (Purdue University).

 Commission B1: Thermodynamics and Transfer Processes

The objectives of Commission B1 on Thermodynamics and Transfer Processes are to provide academic and industrial information and data, and to propose any solutions on thermodynamics and transfer processes. The Commission B1 has been extremely active in IIR Working Groups, sub-commissions, IIR conferences and co-sponsored conferences and commission business meetings.

As well as being involved in IIR Working Groups on the mitigation of direct emissions of greenhouse gases in refrigeration, the commission is equally involved in the Working Group on Life Cycle Climate Performance (LCCP) Evaluation.

Active in IIR conferences and congresses, Commission B1 similarly organises workshops in various fields such as refrigerant charge reduction in refrigerating systems. Initiatives and opportunities, such as the phase-down of high-GWP refrigerants, energy-efficient buildings and cars, transport refrigeration, food preservation, the economic importance of the refrigeration sector, the involvement of the younger generation and identifying industrial needs are all at the heart of Commission B1.

The president of Commission B1 is Prof. Yunho Hwang (University of Maryland).

 Commission B2: Refrigerating Equipment

The president of Commission B1 is Prof. José Miguel Corberan.

Section C: Biology and Food Technology 

The activities of Section C deal with the application of refrigeration technologies to life sciences and food sciences.

Commission C1 Cryobiology, cryomedicine and health products is particularly focused on the application of refrigeration technologies on various branches of medicine: cryosurgery and oncology, cryotherapy, blood, organs and tissue preservation, health products (especially vaccines and thermosensitive preparations). On the one hand, the work focusses on the biological and biochemical aspects of the effects of refrigeration on organs, tissues and treated products, and on the other hand on the applied refrigeration techniques and technologies.

Commission C2 food science and engineering is focused more particularly on the application of refrigeration technologies in the area of food sciences: preservation (refrigeration, freezing); hygiene and safety in its microbiological aspect; process (lyophilisation, cryoconcentration, cryoprecipitation, partial or total crystallisation). The work focuses on establishing a model for the transfer of heat and matter during refrigeration treatments, on the effects of refrigeration on food products, and on the evolution kinetics of products kept in cold storage. The work deals with the impact of the integrity of the cold chain on the quality of food, including in warm climate countries.

The president of Section C is Dr Judith Evans (London South Bank University).

 Commission C1: Cryobiology, Cryomedicine and Health Products
Commission C1 Cryobiology, Cryomedicine and Health Products have clearly defined objectives in cryobiology, cryomedicine and health products research; knowledge dissemination; technology transfer and education.

This commission is truly active and participates in the various workshop series on cryoprocessing of biopharmaceuticals and biomaterials, as well as establishing innovative e-training actions concerning the commission's multidisciplinary needs as well as the interdisciplinary needs of the following commissions: A1 Cryophysics, Cryoengineering, A2 Liquefaction and Separation of Gases and finally C1 Cryobiology, Cyomedicine and Health Products.

The president of Commission C1 is Prof. Noboru Motomura  (University of Tokyo).

 Commission C2: Food Science and Engineering
Commission C2 on Food Science and Engineering focuses on research and breakthrough technologies related to food science and engineering. The commission is key in hosting the IIR Sustainability and the Cold Chain Conference (ICCC), held internationally since 2010. In addition to the Cold Chain conferences and the IIR Congress, Commission C2 has also co-sponsored four other conferences in Macedonia, Spain, Croatia and Germany, and continues to reinforce its leading role at the heart of developments in food science and engineering. The commission was a very active member of the organization team for the 2011 IIR congress in Prague.

IIR Commission C2 is composed of 38 experts from 20 IIR member countries. The commission is involved in various IIR Working Groups and innovative projects linked to the development of the food chain across the globe.

The president of Commission C2 is Mr Alain Le Bail (ONIRIS).

Section D: Storage and Transport 
Section D ON Storage and Transport of the IIR is involved in the controlled-temperature logistics and distribution of temperature-sensitive products, from foodstuffs to health products (medicines, vaccines, blood products, organs ...) from artwork to chemicals.

It addresses all issues of equipment and solutions for a durable cold chain from the production or manufacture, to the consumption or use of these products.

Section D thus covers the issues of storage, transportation by land, air or water, packaging, distribution and delivery of these products to the consumer, and the traceability of the cold chain.

The Section is involved in warehouse and platform equipment, devices for temperature-controlled transport, coolants or cool packs, small coolers and refrigerated containers, chillers, refrigerated furnishings, refrigerated cabinets, climate chambers, refrigerators and freezers, but also to thermometers and temperature recorders.

The cold chain involves many temperature ranges, both positive and negative, from -80 °C to + 63 °C.

The president of Section D is Mr Richard Lawton (CRT Cambridge).

 Commission D1: Refrigerated Storage

Commission D1 on Refrigerated Storage deals with the storage of all products which require temperature control, such as food and pharmaceuticals. Industrial, commercial and residential storage are also taken into account so that, in cooperation with Commission D2 Refrigerated Transport, the entire cold chain is treated, from raw materials to the final product at our home. Refrigeration plays an essential role for perishable products. While the estimated capacity of refrigerated warehouses was over 500 million cubic meters worldwide in 2014, in some countries global food losses due to the lack of a cold chain are still very important and can reach as much as 20% of the global food supply. At the same time, in heavily industrialised countries, the use of commercial and domestic refrigerators accounts for up to 6% of global electricity consumption.

As a result, the Commission faces important issues in order to promote widespread, energy efficient and environmentally friendly storage systems. New refrigerants, synergies to save or exchange energy with other systems and new technologies are the main focus of its activity. One of the most important themes in these days for this commission is energy efficiency

The president of Commission D1 is Kuniaki Kawamura (Mayekawa Mfg. Co. Ltd.)

 Commission D2: Refrigerated Transport

The IIR's Commission D2 on Refrigerated Transport is extremely active. In addition to the IIR's four yearly congress, Commission D2 participates in the IIR Conference on Sustainability and the Cold Chain, held out of synchronisation to the congress.

Every year, Commission D2 CERTE test engineers meet in a European country to discuss refrigerated transport technology and testing issues. This group subsequently advises the United Nations working party on transport of perishable foodstuffs held each year in Geneva. Commission D2 is currently addressing the “Cold Chain for Pharmaceutical Products” and will add this to regular transport discussion and advisory topics. Commission D2 also helps to produce Informatory Notes to assist in areas of technical or regulatory difficulty.

The role of the IIR is well recognized, and in particular, the expertise of the members of Commission D2 makes an important contribution to refrigerated transport issues: reducing food wastage and minimizing emissions.

The president of Commission D2 is Ms Sylvia Minetto (CNR Istituto per le Tecnologie).

Section E: Air Conditioning, Heat pumps and Energy Recovery 
IIR Section E co-ordinates the work of the both Commissions E1 Air-Conditioning and E2 Heat Pumps and Heat Recovery.

The core activities and interests of both Commissions are strongly connected resulting in tight collaborate and jointly organised conferences.

Air-conditioning is a subject that is now more frequently addressed due to both better comfort in an increasing number of countries and the effects of global warming. Now, even countries where demand for air-conditioning during summer months was limited, due to a cooler climate, require the operation of an air-conditioning plant for longer periods. The demand of heating is nevertheless significant and the most efficient system to provide heating is undoubtedly the heat pump. No other technology can provide net primary energy savings, economic benefits to users and reduced climate impact at the same time.

Also providing a cooling effect, the heat pump is expected to be the most common solution in the future for all year round operations. The combination of these technologies, with heat recovery capable buildings or industrial plants, cooling and heating requirements can be meet in the most efficient, reliable, cost-effective and environmentally friendly way.
Section E with its Commissions is made up of 101 experts.

The president of Section E is Prof. Renato Lazzarin (Universita di Padova DTG).

 Commission E1 Air Conditioning

Commission E1 on Air Conditioning often collaborates with Commission E2 on Heat pumps and Energy Recovery as they have at least one common aspect, the compressor. Both Commissions frequently work with the same equipment which is adapted according to the seasons, alternating between air conditioners and heat pumps.

The commission is involved in various aspects of air conditioning from equipment to systems. In the last years it developed a particular focus on energy saving and sustainability, whilst maintaining good conditions of thermal comfort ranging from topics such as free cooling, solar cooling or long term energy storage. The general importance of the themes addressed by the Commission results in relevant International Conferences.

The expertise of the Commission members on the use of new refrigerants in air conditioning systems, annual comparative studies of innovative and renewable energy systems, opportunities of part load operation on air conditioning systems to limit penalties or even to gain efficiency, and on other up-to-date research fields, is valuable, not only to the scientific community but also to the multitude of air conditioning users.

The president of Commission E1 is Prof. Xianting Li (Tsinghua University).

Commission E2: Heat pumps and Energy Recovery
Commission members are proposed by member countries then appointed by the STC following proposals from Presidents of commissions. These commission members comprise industry, university, and research-centre specialists or refrigeration practitioners.

The aim of commission E2 on Heat Pumps, Energy Recovery is to promote and enhance scientific and technological knowledge in heat pump and energy recovery fields thanks to various activities such as the organization or co-sponsoring of international conferences, or the publication of books and Informatory Notes.

The president of Commission E2 is Dr Alberto Coronas (University Rovira i Virgili).

Activities and Services

FRIDOC Database 

FRIDOC is the most comprehensive database in the world dedicated to refrigeration. It contains over 100,000 references to documents in all domains of refrigeration.

A large number of the documents referenced in FRIDOC are scientific and technical. FRIDOC also contains many review articles, documents on economic data and statistics, articles dealing with regulations and standardization, etc.

Publications 
The IIR has over 200 publications available on refrigeration technologies and applications: reference documents, guides, technical books, conference and congress papers and proceedings, tables and diagrams comprising the thermophysical properties of refrigerants.

Books in the refrigeration field published by other publishers are also available for purchase.

International Journal of Refrigeration 

The Institute produces a monthly International Journal of Refrigeration that is published by Elsevier.

The International Journal of Refrigeration is the reference journal in the refrigeration field. It is practical for all those wanting to keep abreast of research and industrial news in all fields of refrigeration including air-conditioning, heat-pump, refrigerated storage and transport.

Newsletter 

The IIR produces an electronic monthly newsletter that features news and updates on the refrigeration sector: regulation, events, economic data, monitoring, technological progress, etc.

It provides a detailed overview of the general developments within the sector worldwide and as acts a regular information tool for readers.

Conferences and Congresses 
The IIR holds international conferences and congresses on key themes which include:
 natural refrigerants
 the cold chain
 magnetic refrigeration
 cryogenics
 compressors
 phase-change materials and slurries
 thermophysical properties and transfer processes of refrigerants
 new technologies

International Congress of Refrigeration 

First held in 1908, the International Congress of Refrigeration of the IIR is a flagship event that converges industry and research. 
Covering all fields of refrigeration, the Congress, which takes place every four years, reunites key international stakeholders and provides perspectives on the future of the industry in line with sustainable development.

Professional Directories 

The IIR publishes two professional Directories: a Laboratory Directory, which lists more than 300 laboratories in 55 countries; an Expertise Directory, which lists over 300 international experts in the refrigeration sector.

Working Groups 

IIR Working Groups operate on a temporary basis, bringing together specialists, to work on projects arising from current issues.

Their aim is to promote development, provide knowledge and give recommendations in these spheres. In order to achieve these objectives, they hold conferences and workshops, write publications and provide recommendations. Members of WGs are IIR members from industry, academia, national administrations and research.

Research Projects

REAL Alternatives 4 LIFE 

Funded by LIFE EU, a funding scheme for projects that address climate issues.

Duration: 3 years (June 2017- June 2020)

Objectives: The REAL Alternatives for LIFE (RA4Life) project is to develop a blended learning programme for alternative refrigerants. The programme will address the safety, efficiency, reliability and containment of low GWP alternative refrigerants (carbon dioxide, ammonia, hydrocarbon and low flammables HFOs and R32) and includes various train the trainer sessions.

CryoHub 

Funded by the European Union Horizon 2020 Research and Innovation Programme.

Duration: 3.5 years with extension (April 2016 - September 2020)

Objectives: The objective of this project is to investigate and extend the potential of large-scale Cryogenic Energy Storage (CES) and explore the application of the stored energy for both cooling and energy generation. By employing Renewable Energy Sources (RES) to liquefy and store cryogens, CryoHub will balance the power grid, while meeting the cooling demand of a refrigerated food warehouse and recovering the waste heat from its equipment and components.

SuperSmart 

Funded by the European Union Horizon 2020 Research and Innovation Programme.

Duration: (February 2016 - January 2019)

Objectives: SuperSmart was an expertise hub for the market uptake of energy efficient supermarkets by raising awareness, knowledge transfer and the preparation of an EU Ecolabel. SuperSmart aimed to achieve both decisive environmental benefits through the fast implementation of efficient heating and cooling solutions, as well as significant economic benefits through reduced energy use in the supermarket sector across Europe.

ELICiT 

Funded by Framework Programme 7 (FP7)

Duration: 3 years (January 2014 - December 2016)

Objectives: The ELICiT project focused on the application of magnetic cooling technology in domestic refrigeration appliances.

COOL-SAVE 

Funded by Intelligent Energy Europe

Duration: 3 years (2012 – April 2015)

Objectives: The COOL-SAVE project carried out the development and dissemination of cost-effective strategies to improve energy efficiency in cooling systems in the food and drink sector. More specifically, it aimed at optimising vapour-compression mechanical systems in the food and drink sector, which can be achieved through the dissemination and the implementation of energy efficient strategies which prove effective.

REAL Alternatives 

Funded by the EU Lifelong Learning Programme

Duration: 2 years (2013 – 2015)

Objectives: This two-year blended learning project for alternative refrigerants was led by a consortium of six partners from across Europe. The consortium included training and professional institutes as well as representative bodies who provide e-learning material. The programme addressed safety, efficiency, reliability and containment of low GWP alternative refrigerants.

FRISBEE 
Funded by Framework Programme 7

Duration: 4 years (August 2010 - 31 August 2014)

Objectives: The objective of the FRISBEE project was to provide new tools, concepts and solutions for improving refrigeration technologies along the European food cold chain.

IIR Network 

Today, the IIR has 59 member countries representing over two-thirds of the global population.

According to their annual financial contributions to the IIR, these member countries are divided into six category levels and this determines the services they receive and their level of voting power within the IIR. Member Countries take part in IIR activities via their delegates and their nominated commission members. The delegates and commission members determine IIR priorities and take part in the IIR scientific activities and Working Groups, and develop recommendations. Member countries are entitled to host several IIR conferences and meetings per year.

Member Countries 

The following countries are members of the IIR:

Benefactor and corporate members 

Benefactor and corporate members can be companies, universities, national, regional or international organizations, laboratories, associations or any other structure active in or connected to the refrigeration industry or IIR activities.

Private members 

Private members include individuals such as researchers, scientists, industrial practitioners, journalists or professors with extensive expertise, passion or active in fields related to the refrigeration sector.

References 

Cooling technology
Food preservation
Heating, ventilation, and air conditioning
Organizations based in Paris
Scientific organizations based in France
Thermodynamics

fr:IIF